Curtis Park may refer to:
 Curtis Park, Sacramento, California, a neighborhood in Sacramento, California
 Curtis Park station, Sharon Hill, Philadelphia